Piper Sandler Companies is an American independent investment bank and financial services company, focused on mergers and acquisitions, financial restructuring, public offerings, public finance, institutional brokerage, investment management and securities research. Through its principal subsidiary, Piper Sandler & Co., the company targets corporations, institutional investors, and public entities.

Based in Minneapolis, Minnesota, Piper Sandler has more than 55 offices. The company was founded in 1895.

Piper Jaffray was named one of America's 50 Most Trustworthy Financial Companies by Forbes magazine in 2015 and 2017. Piper Jaffray was also named 2014 Investment Bank of the Year by Mergers & Acquisitions Journal.

On July 9, 2019, the company announced an agreement to buy fellow investment bank Sandler O'Neill, with the new combined entity to be called Piper Sandler Cos.

History
Piper Sandler traces its roots to 1895 when George Lane established George B. Lane, Commercial Paper and Collateral Loans & Co., a commercial paper brokerage, in Minneapolis. In 1913, Piper, Jaffray Co. was established as another commercial paper business by H.C. Piper Sr. and Clive Palmer (C.P. or Palmer) Jaffray. In 1917, George B. Lane & Co. merged with Piper, Jaffray & Co. to form Lane, Piper & Jaffray.

The firm first obtained a seat on the New York Stock Exchange in 1931 with the acquisition of Hopwood & Company, which had been devastated by the stock market crash. In 1971, Piper first offered stock to the public and became a publicly held corporation known as Piper, Jaffray & Hopwood Incorporated. Later, in 1986, Piper's common stock began trading on the NASDAQ under the ticker symbol PIPR. In 1997, the firm was acquired by U.S. Bancorp, also based in Minneapolis, for $730 million in cash. From 1999 to 2003, the firm was known as U.S. Bancorp Piper Jaffray. In 2003, U.S. Bancorp spun off Piper Jaffray in a stock dividend to its shareholders, making the company independent once again under the symbol PJC. In 2006, the company sold its brokerage business to Zurich-based UBS for $510 million in cash. The business had approximately 800 brokers at that time.

On July 9, 2019, Piper Jaffray announced they were purchasing fellow investment bank Sandler O'Neill for $485M. The new combined entity was going to be named Piper Sandler Cos, and Piper Jaffray CEO Chad Abraham would continue to lead the combined company.

Operations
Piper Sandler operates principally through the following business segments:

Investment banking
Within its investment banking division, Piper Sandler provides advisory and financing services involving:

 Mergers and acquisitions
 Debt capital markets
 Equity capital markets
 Private placements
 Capital advisory and restructuring
 Corporate and venture services

In 2013, Piper Sandler was recognized for the second year in a row as the top healthcare investment bank by Global Finance Magazine.

In February 2016, Piper Sandler acquired Houston-based energy firm Simmons & Company International for a total consideration of approximately $139 million, consisting of $91 million in cash and $48 million in restricted stock.

Public finance
Piper Sandler underwrites debt issuances and provides financial advisory to government and not-for-profit entities. In 2016, the Piper Sandler public finance group ranked No. 2 for senior-managed underwriting and No. 5 for financial advisory transactions by number of issues.

Institutional brokerage
Piper Sandler serves institutional investors and corporate clients through the following segments:

 Equity sales and trading
 Fixed income sales and trading
 Equity research
 Strategic analytics and balance sheet management

Asset management
Piper Sandler provides investment management and advisory services to institutional clients in the areas of equity, fixed income, private equity funds, master limited partnership and merchant banking. In 2010, the company acquired Advisory Research, Inc., a Chicago-based asset management firm with approximately $7 billion in assets under management. Advisory Research provides U.S., international, global and MLP and energy infrastructure strategies to institutional investors.

Diversity 

Piper Sandler has been recognized six years (2012-2017) for gender diversity on its board of directors by receiving the "W" distinction from 2020 Women on Boards. This designation is given to companies with corporate boards which are at least 20% women.

Regulator fines
In 2002, Piper Sandler was fined $25 million by state and federal regulators to settle charges that it provided biased stock ratings as part of the Global Analyst Research Settlements.  Other firms, such as JP Morgan, Goldman Sachs, Merrill Lynch, UBS, Deutsche Bank and Morgan Stanley were fined for similar reasons. The firm agreed to make structural changes relating to its research and investment banking program to restore confidence in its business.

Office locations

  Aberdeen, Scotland
  Albany, New York
  Albuquerque, New Mexico
  Alpharetta, Georgia
  Atlanta, Georgia
  Austin, Texas
  Baltimore, Maryland
  Barrington, Illinois
  Birmingham, Alabama
  Boca Raton, Florida
  Boise, Idaho
  Boston, Massachusetts
  Charleston, West Virginia
  Charlotte, North Carolina
  Chicago, Illinois
  Cleveland, Ohio
  Columbus, Ohio
  Dallas, Texas
  Denver, Colorado
  Des Moines, Iowa
  El Segundo, California
  Hartford, Connecticut
  Hong Kong
  Houston, Texas
  Indianapolis, Indiana
  Jacksonville, Florida
  Kansas City, Missouri
  London, England
  Long Island, New York
  Los Angeles
  Memphis, Tennessee
  Milwaukee, Wisconsin
  Minneapolis, Minnesota
  Moody, Alabama
  Nashville, Tennessee
  New York, New York
  Orange County, California
  Philadelphia, Pennsylvania
  Phoenix, Arizona
  Pittsburgh, Pennsylvania
  Portland, Oregon
  Sacramento, California
  San Antonio, Texas
  San Francisco, California
  Seattle, Washington
  St. Louis, Missouri
  Washington, D.C.
  Westport, Connecticut
  Zurich, Switzerland

See also

References

External links

 The  Piper Jaffray Corporate Records are available for research use at the Minnesota Historical Society.

U.S. Bancorp
Companies based in Minneapolis
Companies listed on the New York Stock Exchange
Investment banks in the United States
American companies established in 1895
Financial services companies established in 1895
Banks established in 1895
1895 establishments in Minnesota
1980s initial public offerings